Notascea obliquaria is a moth of the  family Notodontidae. It is found in Paraguay.

References

External links
discoverlife.org

Notodontidae of South America
Moths described in 1906
Notodontidae